The Sacrifice of Abraham may be:

 Binding of Isaac
 Eid al-Adha